Shuko Aoyama and Makoto Ninomiya were the defending champions, but both players chose not to participate.

Han Xinyun and Ye Qiuyu won the title, defeating Hiroko Kuwata and Zhu Lin in the final, 6–3, 6–3.

Seeds

Draw

References
Main Draw

Blossom Cup - Doubles
Industrial Bank Cup